Kannan a/l Kalaiselvan (born 26 July 1996) is a Malaysian footballer who plays for Petaling Jaya City as a left-back.

Club career

Selangor
Kannan started his career at Selangor youth team before being promoted into first team in 2016. Kannan made his league debut for Selangor in a 1–1 draw against Sarawak on 24 August 2016.

Career statistics

Club

1 Includes AFC Cup and AFC Champions League.

References

External links
 
 Profile at faselangor.my

1996 births
Living people
Malaysian footballers
Selangor FA players
PKNS F.C. players
Petaling Jaya City FC players
Malaysia Super League players
Tamil sportspeople
Malaysian people of Tamil descent
Malaysian sportspeople of Indian descent
Association football fullbacks
Malaysia international footballers